WGDR (91.1 FM) is a noncommercial American radio station licensed to Plainfield, Vermont, serving central Vermont. WGDR, owned by Central Vermont Community Radio Corporation, is a hybrid community/public radio station, broadcasting a freeform format. Founded in 1973, it is the oldest non-commercial community radio station in Vermont.

The station broadcasts a mix of music and public affairs programming produced by local volunteers from northern and central Vermont, plus Pacifica Radio programming. It was one of only a handful of radio stations in the U.S. to broadcast news from the English-language international channel of the Qatar-based TV network Al Jazeera, until the network launched a separate U.S.-based channel, Al Jazeera America, in August 2013. There are 65 on-air volunteers on the staff.

In 2009, WGDR received a My Source Community Impact Award (an award created by the Corporation for Public Broadcasting) for its Community Broadcast Training program. That same year,  the station was granted a construction permit by the Federal Communications Commission to build a second transmission tower near Hardwick, Vermont and operate on a second frequency to reach a much wider area of northern and central Vermont.

On March 1, 2011, the FCC granted an operating license to the new station, which began full-power regular broadcasting on March 7, 2011. The new station, assigned the call letters WGDH, broadcasts at 91.7 FM, simulcasting with WGDR.

Effective May 10, 2021, Goddard College Corporation donated the licenses for WGDR and sister station WGDH to Central Vermont Community Radio Corporation.

See also
List of community radio stations in the United States

References

External links
 WGDR website
 

GDR
Community radio stations in the United States
Radio stations established in 1973
1973 establishments in Vermont
Goddard College